Anthene mahota, the Mahota ciliate blue, is a butterfly in the family Lycaenidae. It is found in Liberia, Ivory Coast, Nigeria (the Cross River loop), Cameroon, Equatorial Guinea (Mbini), Gabon, the Republic of the Congo and the Democratic Republic of the Congo (Mongala and Sankuru). The habitat consists of dense forests.

References

Butterflies described in 1887
Anthene
Butterflies of Africa
Taxa named by Henley Grose-Smith